Tim Lawrence may refer to:

Tim Lawrence (actor), British actor
Tim Lawrence (author), British author

See also
Timothy Laurence, husband of Anne, Princess Royal